Mark Clayson Gardner  (11 September 1884 – 2 November 1949) was an Australian rules footballer who played with Melbourne and University in the Victorian Football League (VFL). He was the younger brother of Corrie Gardner and Eric Gardner.

Notes

External links

Demon Wiki profile

Obituary in British Medical Journal

1884 births
Australian rules footballers from Melbourne
University Football Club players
Melbourne Football Club players
1949 deaths
People educated at Melbourne Grammar School
People educated at Trinity College (University of Melbourne)
Recipients of the Military Cross
Australian recipients of the Military Cross
People from Hawthorn, Victoria